Richard Sainct (14 April 1970 – 29 September 2004) was a French rally raid motorcycle rider, best known for his three victories on The Paris-Dakar rally in 1999, 2000 and 2003.

Biography
His other notable achievements include winning the Tunisia Rally twice in 1998 and 1999; the Moroccan Rally in 1997, 1998, 2001 and 2002; and the Pharaons Rally in 2002. He also won the FIA Rally Raid World Cup in 2002.

Death
He was killed on 29 September 2004 on the fourth stage of the Pharaons Rally in Egypt, Sainct fell and was assisted by the Italian teammate Fabrizio Meoni, who helped him get up and be honest with his condition. To the Tuscan who helped him, Sainct seemed in a light confusion, but insisted on wanting to leave. He resumed the race, with no apparent problems, and stopped at the assistance expected after 211 km of the race.

After 270 kilometers of stage Sainct was the victim of a second fall and was found on the ground and already devoid of life. The heartbeat seemed absent when the rescue helicopter intervened with a doctor on board. Probably, in the first fall, Sainct reported some internal injury. The KTM decided to withdraw all its bikes from the race, but the race director, the former Belgian driver Jacky Ickx, decided to continue the race.

Rally Dakar
Sainct won 15 stages in his rally raid participations, the complete results are in the Dakar Historic Book.

References

External links
 Biker profile at Parisdakar.it

1970 births
2004 deaths
Enduro riders
French motorcycle racers
French rally drivers
Motorcycle racers who died while racing
Off-road motorcycle racers
Sport deaths in Egypt
Dakar Rally motorcyclists
Dakar Rally winning drivers